Aleksandr Nikolaevich Malinin (born Vyguzov, ; 16 November 1958) is a Russian singer who was named a People's Artist of Russia in 1997.

Career
Malinin was born in Yekaterinburg (then Sverdlovsk) as Aleksandr Nikolaevich Vyguzov.

At the end of the 1980s, he toured the United States and made a duet with David Pomeranz, becoming the first Soviet singer to collaborate with an American musician since the breakout of the Cold War.

Between 1990 and 1996, he gave several sold-out concerts named Балы с Александром Малининым (Dances with Aleksandr Malinin), breaking attendance records. The series of concerts were also broadcast on television. In 1994, he received the World Music Award as the best selling Russian artist. 

Malinin is married and has four children. His son named Anton (born in 1982) was educated in part in the UK, attending Haileybury & Imperial Service College in Hertfordshire.

Popular Songs

"Berega" ("Берега")
"Belyj Kon" ("Белый конь")
"Naprasnie slova" ("Напрасные слова")
"Molba" ("Мольба")
"Zabava" ("Забава")
"I Lyubov' i razluka" ("Любовь и разлука")
"Dai bog" ("Дай, Бог")
"Nado zhit" ("Надо жить")
"Ty Takaya Krasivaya" ("Ты такая красивая")

Awards

|-
! colspan="3" style="background: cyan;" | World Music Awards
|-

|-

References

External links
 Official website
Alexander Malinin at MTV

Alexander Malinin at iTunes

20th-century Russian singers
21st-century Russian singers
People's Artists of Russia
Recipients of the title of People's Artists of Ukraine
World Music Awards winners
1958 births
Living people
20th-century Russian male singers
21st-century Russian male singers